County routes in St. Lawrence County, New York, are signed with the Manual on Uniform Traffic Control Devices-standard yellow-on-blue pentagon route marker.

Routes 1–30

Routes 31 and up

See also

County routes in New York
List of former state routes in New York (101–200)

References

External links

Empire State Roads – St. Lawrence County Roads